Leif Gordon Wikström (18 August 1918 – 27 January 1991) was a Swedish sailor. He was a crew member of the Swedish boat Slaghöken II that won the gold medal in the Dragon class at the 1956 Summer Olympics.

References

1918 births
1991 deaths
Swedish male sailors (sport)
Olympic sailors of Sweden
Olympic gold medalists for Sweden
Olympic medalists in sailing
Medalists at the 1956 Summer Olympics
Sailors at the 1956 Summer Olympics – Dragon
Royal Gothenburg Yacht Club sailors